Thomas Neil Wolfe  (born 20 October 1941) is a former New Zealand rugby union player, businessman, sports administrator and local politician. He played 14 matches, including six Tests, for the New Zealand national rugby team, the All Blacks, between 1961 and 1968. He was active in sports administration, including as president of the Taranaki Rugby Union and the Taranaki Jockey Club, and served as a New Plymouth district councillor between 2004 and 2010.

Early life and family
Wolfe was born in New Plymouth on 20 October 1941, the son of Welsh-born Mary Wolfe (née Thomas) and Harry Wolfe, originally from Australia. He was educated at New Plymouth Boys' High School, where he played for the school's 1st XV rugby team for four years, coached by JJ Stewart, and was captain of the team in his final year, 1959. He went on to study accountancy at Victoria University of Wellington from 1960 to 1962.

Wolfe met his future wife, nurse Raewyn Phillips, in 1963. The couple married at St Mary's Church, New Plymouth, in April 1966, and went on to have four children, including television actress and film director Katie Wolfe, and Todd Wolfe, who played provincial rugby for Taranaki.

Rugby union career
Wolfe played his rugby as a first five-eighth, second five-eighth or centre.

He made his Wellington debut in 1960 as an 18-year-old, and his dazzling footwork soon brought him national attention, and rough treatment from opposition loose forwards.

Wolfe was on the fringe of national selection in 1960, and was first selected for the All Blacks for the first Test against the touring French team at Eden Park on 22 July 1961. Aged 19 years 275 days, Wolfe was, at the time, the seventh youngest All Blacks player on Test debut, and  remains the 10th-youngest of all time. He appeared in the second and third tests against France, and the following year toured Australia with the national side, playing in six of the 10 matches including both Tests against . When the Australian team toured New Zealand later that season, Wolfe played at first five-eighth in the first Test at Carisbrook, but Bruce Watt and Mack Herewini were preferred in that position for the second and third Tests.

After completing his university studies, Wolfe returned to New Plymouth at the end of 1962, and represented  71 times from 1963 to 1969. He was a part of the team during their tenure of the Ranfurly Shield with 15 successful defences of the trophy from 1963 to 1965.

Wolfe's international career continued in 1963, playing at second five-eighth in the first Test at Eden Park against the touring England team. However, he was dropped for the second Test, with Pat Walsh preferred. Wolfe broke his arm playing against  later in the season, and did not play for the All Blacks again until being selected for the 1968 tour of Australia during which he appeared in four matches but did not play in any of the internationals.

Wolfe retired from rugby in 1969, having played 146 first-class matches, including All Black trials and inter-island games for the North Island. He played 14 games for the All Blacks including six Tests.

Business career
Wolfe became the owner of Taranaki's last-remaining soft-drink manufacturer, Western Bottling Company Limited, after his father died in 1977. The company had been built up by his father and uncles after they purchased it in the 1930s and later began manufacturing Coca-Cola under licence. Wolfe expanded the operation further before selling the business to Auckland-based Oasis Industries in 1988.

Community involvement
Wolfe has had wide involvement in sports and community organisations in Taranaki. He was vice-president and president of the Taranaki Rugby Football Union, president of the Taranaki Jockey Club, chair of the Taranaki Racing District, and a member of the New Plymouth Stadium board. He served as chair of the New Plymouth Central School board of trustees and as a member of the New Plymouth Boys' High School board, including 15 years as chair. He chaired the New Zealand Community Trust regional advisory committee, which oversees the distribution of gaming proceeds to community organisations in Taranaki, and was a board member of Massey University's L. A. Alexander Agricultural Trust.

Wolfe was elected as a New Plymouth district councillor in 2004, and served two terms before retiring in 2010.

Later life
In the 2015 New Year Honours, Wolfe was appointed a Member of the New Zealand Order of Merit, for services to sport, education and the community. In later years, Wolfe has suffered from dementia, thought to be linked to numerous concussions that he experienced during his rugby-playing days.

References

1941 births
Living people
Rugby union players from New Plymouth
People educated at New Plymouth Boys' High School
Victoria University of Wellington alumni
New Zealand rugby union players
New Zealand international rugby union players
Wellington rugby union players
Taranaki rugby union players
Rugby union fly-halves
Rugby union centres
New Zealand businesspeople
New Zealand sports executives and administrators
Local politicians in New Zealand
Members of the New Zealand Order of Merit
People with dementia